Copala may refer to:

Mexico
Copala, Guerrero, city in southwestern Mexico
Copala (municipality) in the State of Guerrero, southwestern Mexico
Copala, Sinaloa, also known as San José de Copala, 400-year-old silvermining town near Mazatlan in northwestern Mexico
San Juan Copala, an indigenous Triqui community and autonomous municipality in Oaxaca state

Other
 Copala, a fabled mythical city of gold sought by Spanish conquistadors such as Francisco de Ibarra
 Copala Trique, a variant of the Trique language spoken in San Juan Copala, Oaxaca

See also
Coppola (disambiguation)
Copula (disambiguation)
Cupula (disambiguation)
Cupola (disambiguation)